Stanislav Yuryevich Markelov (20 May 1974 – 19 January 2009) was a Russian human rights lawyer. He participated in a number of publicized cases, including those of left-wing political activists and antifascists persecuted since the 1990s, as well as journalists and victims of police violence.

Inter alia, Markelov had been the attorney for the family of Elza Kungaeva, a young Chechen woman killed by Russian colonel Yuri Budanov, who was released from prison in mid-January, 15 months before his original sentence was to end.

Markelov was murdered on 19 January 2009 in Moscow.

Career
Markelov was a president of the Russian Rule of Law Institute. He represented Anna Politkovskaya, who was gunned down in Moscow in 2006; Mikhail Beketov, the editor of a pro-opposition newspaper who was severely beaten in November 2008; and many Chechen civilians who had been tortured. He also defended people who were victims of the Moscow theater hostage crisis.

Murder
Anastasia Baburova, a journalist for Novaya Gazeta who tried to come to Markelov's assistance, was also shot and killed in the attack.

Comments
The BBC reported that Markelov planned to appeal the early release of Budanov. Budanov, sentenced to ten years in prison, was released early because he had "repented". When reached for a comment, Budanov denounced the killings as a provocation aimed at fueling animosity between Russians and Chechens and offered condolences to the families of the deceased.

According to Russian military analyst Pavel Felgenhauer, the details of the murder indicate the involvement of Russian state security services. He stated:

Condolences
The president of Ukraine Viktor Yushchenko sent a telegram to the parents of Anastasia Baburova on 23 January 2009. Russian President Dmitry Medvedev offered his condolences six days later.

Distrust
Investigations by the radio station Echo of Moscow indicate that most people distrusted the authorities and thought they could not adequately investigate the murder and that the crimes would not be solved. The distrust stimulated the wide discussion of the murder and protests.

Reactions
Close to 300 young people protested in Moscow with slogans such as "United Russia is a fascist country" and "Markelov will live forever". More than 2,000 people took to the streets of Grozny.

Human Rights Watch and Amnesty International requested an impartial investigation.

A hate crimes expert, Galina Kozhevnikova, said in February 2009 that she received an e-mailed threat warning her to "get ready" to join Markelov.

Investigation
In November 2009, Russian authorities declared the end of the criminal investigation. The murder suspects were 29-year-old Nikita Tikhonov and his girlfriend, 24-year-old Yevgenia Khasis, a radical nationalist couple involved with a group called Russky Obraz or Russian Image and associated with the identitarian organization BORN (Battle Organization of Russian Nationalists). Initially, "Russkiy Obraz" was a magazine, set up by Tikhonov and his friend Ilya Goryachev in 2002 as a clone of the radical fascist Serbian "Image" formed by Mladen Obradovic, Deacon Boban Milovanovic and Alexander Mishich. Both were students of history at Moscow State University. According to Tikhonov, the identitarian organization BORN was founded by him and Goryachev in 2007. According to both Khasis and Sergey Smirnov, Russky Obraz was the political roof for BORN similar to Sein Fein's relationship to the Irish Republican Army. According to Khasis, Leonid Simunin was the BORN connection to the Kremlin and the presidential administration through Vladislav Surkov with a siloviki as the retired FSB officer Aleksey Korshunov another strong supporter of BORN.

According to investigators, Tikhonov was the one who committed the murder, while Khasis reported to him, by cell phone, the movements of Markelov and Baburova right before the assault. The motive of the murder was revenge for Markelov's prior work as a lawyer in the interests of Trotskyite activists. The murder suspects were arrested, and were reported to have confessed. In May 2011, Tikhonov was sentenced to life imprisonment, and Khasis was sentenced to 18 years in prison.

FSB director Alexander Bortnikov reported to Russian President Dmitry Medvedev that the radical group in question committed a murder on ethnic grounds in September 2009 and was preparing another one.

In 2015, another member of the BORN nationalis group Ilya Goryachev was sentenced for murder of Markelov.

Notes

References

His articles
Stanislav Markelov, "Russia's 'Filtration System'"
Stanislav Markelov, Do Not Read This book

External links

 Lawyer and human rights activist Stanislav Markelov murdered in Moscow World Socialist Web Site
 "Leading Russian Rights Lawyer Shot in Moscow", The New York Times (20 January 2009)
 Obituary for Stanislav Markelov by Vladislav Bugera, JRL (20 January 2009) (the copy)
 Murder in Moscow. Press criticism, KGB-style by Stephen Schwartz, The Weekly Standard (23 February 2009)
 Markelov's website (Russian)

1974 births
2009 deaths
Writers from Moscow
Assassinated Russian journalists
Deaths by firearm in Russia
Journalists killed in Russia
20th-century Russian lawyers
Russian anti-fascists
Russian human rights activists
Russian murder victims
People murdered in Moscow
21st-century Russian lawyers
Kutafin Moscow State Law University alumni
2009 murders in Russia